Jayawantrao Sawant College of Engineering (JSCOE) is approved by the All India Council of Technical Education (AICTE), New Delhi, Recognized by Govt. of Maharashtra and affiliated to Pune University. It was established by JSPM at Handewadi Road, Hadapsar, Pune, Maharashtra, India.

Courses

Undergraduate

Bachelor of Engineering (B.E.) courses are for a duration of four years:
 Computer Engineering
 Electronics and Telecommunication Engineering
 Electrical Engineering
 Information Technology
 Mechanical Engineering

Postgraduate

Computer Engineering, Master of Engineering (M.E.)
Digital System, Master of Engineering (M.E.)
Design Engineering, Master of Engineering (M.E.)
Heat Power Engineering, Master of Engineering (M.E.)
Master of Business Administration (MBA)
Master of Computer Application (MCA)

Sister institutes
The JSPM runs the following institutes:
 JSPM Narhe Technical Campus (JSPM NTC)
 Rajshri Shahu College of Engineering (RSCOE)
 Imperial College of Engineering & Research (ICOER)

See also
 Jayawantrao Sawant Polytechnic

References

External links
 Official Website
 Facebook Page
 Map

Information technology institutes
Colleges affiliated to Savitribai Phule Pune University
Engineering colleges in Pune
Educational institutions established in 2004
2004 establishments in Maharashtra